Plug compatible refers to "hardware that is designed to perform exactly like another vendor's product." The term PCM was originally applied to manufacturers who made replacements for IBM peripherals. Later this term was used to refer to IBM-compatible computers.

PCM and peripherals
Before the rise of the PCM peripheral industry, computing systems were either configured with peripherals designed and built by the CPU vendor, or designed to use vendor-selected rebadged devices.

The first example of plug compatible IBM subsystems were tape drives and controls offered by Telex beginning 1965. Memorex in 1968 was first to enter the IBM plug-compatible disk followed shortly thereafter by a number of suppliers such as CDC, Itel, and Storage Technology Corporation. This was boosted by the world's largest user of computing equipment in both directions.

Ultimately plug-compatible products were offered for most peripherals and system main memory.

PCM and computer systems
A plug-compatible machine is one that has been designed to be backward compatible with a prior machine. In particular, a new computer system that is plug-compatible has not only the same connectors and protocol interfaces to peripherals, but also binary-code compatibility—it runs the same software as the old system. A plug compatible manufacturer or PCM is a company that makes such products.

One recurring theme in plug-compatible systems is the ability to be bug compatible as well. That is, if the forerunner system had software or interface problems, then the successor must have (or simulate) the same problems. Otherwise, the new system may generate unpredictable results, defeating the full compatibility objective. Thus, it is important for customers to understand the difference between a "bug" and a "feature", where the latter is defined as an intentional modification to the previous system (e.g. higher speed, lighter weight, smaller package, better operator controls, etc.).

PCM and IBM mainframes
The original example of PCM mainframes was the Amdahl 470 mainframe computer which was plug-compatible with the IBM System 360 and 370, costing millions of dollars to develop.  Similar systems were available from Comparex, Fujitsu, and Hitachi. Not all were large systems. Most of these system vendors eventually left the PCM market. In late 1981, there were eight PCM companies, and collectively they had 36 IBM-compatible models.

Non-computer usage of the term
The term may also be used to define replacement criteria for other components available from multiple sources. For example, a plug-compatible cooling fan may need to have not only the same physical size and shape, but also similar capability, run from the same voltage, use similar power, attach with a standard electrical connector, and have similar mounting arrangements. Some non-conforming units may be re-packaged or modified to meet plug-compatible requirements, as where an adapter plate is provided for mounting, or a different tool and instructions are supplied for installation, and these modifications would be reflected in the bill of materials for such components. Similar issues arise for computer system interfaces when competitors wish to offer an easy upgrade path.

In general, plug-compatible systems are designed where industry or de facto standards have rigorously defined the environment, and there is a large installed population of machines that can benefit from third-party enhancements. Plug compatible does not mean identical replacement. However, nothing prevents a company from developing follow-on products that are backward-compatible with its own early products.

See also
 Bug compatibility
 Clone (computing)
 Computer compatibility
 Drop-in replacement
 Hercules (emulator)
 Pin compatibility
 Proprietary hardware
 Vendor lock-in
 Honeywell 200, chasing the IBM 1401 market
 Xerox 530, chasing the IBM 1130 market

References

Classes of computers
Computer hardware
Interoperability